Lake Creek Township may refer to:
 Lake Creek Township, Calhoun County, Iowa
 Lake Creek Township, Pettis County, Missouri
 Lake Creek Township, Bladen County, North Carolina, in Bladen County, North Carolina
 Lake Creek Township, Pennington County, South Dakota

Township name disambiguation pages